Story Syndicate is an American film production and television production company founded in 2019 by Liz Garbus and Dan Cogan. The company primarily features documentary films and television series.

They have produced such films as All In: The Fight for Democracy (2020), Fauci (2021), and Becoming Cousteau (2021). They have also produced the television series The Innocence Files (2020), I'll Be Gone in the Dark (2020-21), Nuclear Family (2021), and Harry & Meghan (2022).

History
In June 2019, it was announced Liz Garbus and Dan Cogan would launch Story Syndicate, a production company, producing documentary and narrative film and television series.

The company has produced such films as All In: The Fight for Democracy (2020) directed by Garbus and Lisa Cortés, Fauci (2021), directed by John Hoffman and Janet Tobias, Becoming Cousteau (2021), directed by Garbus, Britney vs. Spears (2021), directed by Erin Lee Carr, and Mayor Pete directed by Jesse Moss. 

The company has multiple projects in development including an animated series Pearl created and executive produced by Meghan Markle; and a docu-series focusing on the GameStop short squeeze for Netflix.

References

External links
 

American companies established in 2019
Film production companies of the United States